Sandrine Veysset (born 29 March 1967) is a French film director and screenwriter.

Life and career
Veysset was born in Avignon. She studied French literature until she dropped out of school to pursue filmmaking.  A friend introduced her to Léos Carax and she was hired as his driver while he was shooting Les Amants du Pont-Neuf (The Lovers on the Bridge) (1991) in 1989.  Her first real contact with cinema happened when she became an assistant to the art director of that film.  The experience encouraged her to begin writing her first screenplay in 1991.

She directed from her first script in 1995 and the resulting film, Will It Snow for Christmas? (Y aura-t-il de la neige à Noël?) (1996), won her a César Award in 1997 for Best First Film.

Her third film, Martha...Martha (2001) opened the Directors' Fortnight at the 2001 Cannes Film Festival.

Collaborators
Veysset worked with Ognon Pictures producer Humbert Balsan and camerawoman Hélène Louvanton on all her films.

Filmography
Will It Snow for Christmas? (1996)
Victor... Pendant qui'il est trop tard (1998) 
Martha...Martha (2001)
Il sera une fois... (2006)
L'Histoire d'une mère (2016)

References
Will it Snow for Christmas? presskit, Zeitgeist Films, retrieved April 15, 2006

External links 
 

French film directors
Writers from Avignon
1967 births
Living people
French women film directors
French women screenwriters
French screenwriters